Tom Scott (born 1984) is a New Zealand rapper. He is known for his role in the groups Home Brew, At Peace, and Avantdale Bowling Club. His groups are generally characterized by jazz-influenced instrumentation and political lyrics.

NPR has described Scott as "one of the biggest role players" in New Zealand hip hop; The Spinoff identifies him as "New Zealand hip-hop's finest storyteller [and] most brazen agitator".

Early life
Tom Scott was born in the United Kingdom in 1984, but lived there only briefly before his family moved to New Zealand in 1987. Scott spent most of his childhood in Avondale, Auckland, a town that would become one of the inspirations for the "Avantdale Bowling Club" name.

Scott began rapping at the age of ten, initially only as a hobby. His father, jazz bassist Peter Scott, also introduced Scott to 1970s jazz, soul, and funk from a young age.

Career

Home Brew
After leaving university, Scott returned to the Auckland area to focus on music. Scott connected with producer Haz Beats online; the two then recruited Lui "Lui Silk" Gamaka and formed the band Home Brew. The group released several EPs throughout the later 2000s, followed by their self-titled studio album in 2012. Home Brew reached the number-one position on the New Zealand album charts in the week of 7 May 2012, and won Best Urban / Hip Hop Album at the 2012 New Zealand Music Awards. During his time with Home Brew, Scott attracted attention and controversy for his stridently political material, including frequent criticism of then-Prime Minister John Key.

As of 2019, Home Brew continues to tour together.

At Peace
Tom Scott was a member of the band At Peace, along with fellow vocalist Lui Tuiasau and producers Christoph El Truento, Dandruff Dicky, and B Haru. The group released three albums between 2012 and 2014, and disbanded in 2015. Each of the group's albums was nominated for the Taite Music Prize.

During his time with At Peace, Scott attracted controversy after releasing a song titled "Kill the PM". The song, released in 2014, threatened to kill John Key and to have sex with his daughter. In a subsequent interview with Radio New Zealand, Scott stated that he did not regret his statements, before criticizing Key further and ultimately walking out of the interview. Scott later clarified his goals on a Facebook post, stating that his threats were not literal and that his intent was to encourage people to register to vote. Looking back on the controversy in 2018, Scott acknowledged that he had handled the situation poorly, but stated his belief that, as an artist, he had a responsibility to speak out about political issues he found important.

After the backlash to "Kill the PM", Scott and bandmate Lui Tuiasau formed a new group called Average Rap Band, seeking to release music that the public would not associate with the controversy. In contrast to the prominent jazz influences that appear in most of Scott's projects, Average Rap Band instead uses a 1980s-inspired, synthesizer-driven sound.

Avantdale Bowling Club
After moving to Collingwood, Melbourne, Australia, in 2013, Scott began writing lyrics to occupy his time while in the unfamiliar environment of the city. He subsequently returned to Avondale in 2017, at which point he announced the foundation of Avantdale Bowling Club and began collaborating with a large group of musicians to expand the material into a full album. The group's debut album, Avantdale Bowling Club, was released in 2018; it went on to win the Taite Music Prize in 2019, and to be named Album of the Year at the 2019 New Zealand Music Awards.

Avantdale Bowling Club released its second album, Trees, in 2022.

Musical style
Massive magazine described Tom Scott's work with Home Brew as being "fun and satirical" and featuring "well-rehearsed flows"; The Spinoff has characterized his work from that era as "frank, controversial and at times even shocking". While Scott's lyrical content in Home Brew was widely known for "drug and alcohol-fuelled songs", he has moved away from that content on his more recent projects. Scott's lyrics in Avantdale Bowling Club have been described as "blending working-class storytelling and New Zealand colloquialisms", and as being "deeply personal and affecting".

Nick Bollinger of Radio New Zealand described Scott's early work as "quick, witty, [and] occasionally anti-social", and characterized his performance with Avantdale Bowling Club as "polyrhythmic rhyming" that is "mature, reflective, and cautiously hopeful". Karl Puschmann of The New Zealand Herald identifies a similar progression, describing Scott as "delight[ing] in being as juvenile and obnoxious as possible" with Home Brew before featuring increasingly more mature work with his succeeding projects.

Personal life
As of 2018, Scott was engaged.

Scott has one son, who was born in the late 2010s. Scott has stated that he left Melbourne for Avondale because he wanted to raise his son in New Zealand.

Discography

with Home Brew

Home Brew (2012)

with At Peace
@Peace (2012)
Girl Songs (2013)
@Peace and the Plutonian Noise Symphony (2014)

with Average Rap Band
El Sol (2016)

with Avantdale Bowling Club
Avantdale Bowling Club (2018)
Trees (2022)

References

Living people
1984 births
New Zealand rappers